Aiceona is the only genus in Aiceoninae: a monotypic subfamily of aphids.

References

Aphididae
Hemiptera subfamilies
Sternorrhyncha genera